"Baby Workout" is an R&B song by Jackie Wilson from the album of the same name. The track is about Wilson urging a girl to dance (work out) all night with him. It was Wilson's biggest hit of his singles that charted on both the Billboard Hot 100 and the Hot R&B/Hip-Hop Songs. It was his fifth and penultimate #1 R&B song. It was his second highest-charting song on the pop charts, peaking at #5.  It was written by Wilson and good friend Alonzo Tucker, an original member of the famed 1950s Doo Wop group, the Midnighters. 

George Benson covered the song for his 1990 album Big Boss Band. It was also released as a single.

References

External links
 List of cover versions of "Baby Workout" at SecondHandSongs.com

1963 singles
Jackie Wilson songs
1963 songs
Brunswick Records singles
Songs about dancing